Thame Rangers Football Club is a football club originally based in Thame, Oxfordshire, England.

History
The club joined the Senior Section of the Wycombe & District League in 2015, going on to win the league title losing only one league game all season. They then joined Division Two of the Spartan South Midlands League, which they also won at the first attempt, resulting in promotion. They were also transferred to the Hellenic League, becoming members of Division One East.

At the end of the 2020–21 season the club were transferred back to the Spartan South Midlands League, joining Division One.

Honours
Spartan South Midlands League
Division Two champions 2016–17
Wycombe & District League
Senior Division champions 2015–16

References

Football clubs in England
Football clubs in Oxfordshire
Thame
Hellenic Football League
Spartan South Midlands Football League